Crime in Macau ranges from triad attacks, gang violence, money laundering, human trafficking, pickpocketing, petty theft, murder, corruption, etc.

Law enforcement agencies
The Secretary for Public Security used to be the top law enforcement officer in the Portuguese Macau. After the handover of Macau from Portugal to China in 1999, the agency changed to Secretariat for Security.

Types of crime

Civil unrest
There are several public demonstrations and strikes but they are rarely violent.

Human trafficking

Human trafficking in Macau is pervasive.

Sex trafficking

Sex trafficking in Macau is an issue. Macau and foreign women and girls are forced into prostitution in brothels, homes, and businesses in the city.

See also
 Crime in China

References